Dromia dormia, the sleepy sponge crab or common sponge crab, is the largest species of sponge crab.

Distribution
Dromia dormia has a widespread distribution in the Indo-Pacific region. Its range extends from East Africa (including Madagascar, the Seychelles and Mauritius) and the Red Sea through the Malay Archipelago, south to Queensland (Australia), north to China and Japan and as far east as Hawaii and French Polynesia. It is mostly found in shallow waters, with the deepest record being .

Description

Behaviour
Like other related crabs, D. dormia camouflages itself by carrying a sponge on its back, which it cuts to size with its claws, and then holds in place with its last two pairs of legs. Instead of a sponge, D. dormia has occasionally been observed carrying other materials, including a hollow piece of wood, and the sole of a discarded shoe.

Life cycle
Little reproductive data is available for D. dormia. One ovigerous (egg-carrying) female from the Marquesas Islands was carrying around 130,000 eggs, each 0.5 mm in diameter.

Taxonomic history
Dromia dormia was among the first dromiid crabs to be collected, because of its large size and the fact that it occurs in shallow waters. It was first described by Carl Linnaeus in his 1763 work Centuria Insectorum, under the name Cancer Dormia. An earlier description was published by Georg Eberhard Rumphius in his 1705 work De Amboinsche Rariteitkamer, but this predates the starting point for zoological nomenclature. There are a number of related species, which have often been confused with each other, including "Dromia rumphii", some examples of which are now considered to belong to Lauridromia dehaani.

References

Dromiacea
Crustaceans described in 1763
Taxa named by Carl Linnaeus